Jeadine Shemar White (born 7 July 2000) is a Jamaican international footballer who plays for Cavalier, as a goalkeeper.

Club career
Born in Kingston, White has played club football for Cavalier and Humble Lions. In 2020, White returned to Cavalier.

On 2 October 2021, White saved two penalties to help Cavalier win the  National Premier League; their first league title since 1981.

International career
After playing for Jamaica at under-20 level, he made his senior international debut for Jamaica in 2018.

Honours

 Winner (1): 2021 National Premier League

References

2000 births
Living people
Jamaican footballers
Jamaica under-20 international footballers
Jamaica international footballers
Cavalier F.C. players
Humble Lions F.C. players
National Premier League players
Association football goalkeepers